A transmittal document is a "packing slip" for a document or collection of documents that are transferred from one company to another. The transmittal might be just the front page in an extensive document. But more often it is a separate document file that contains details of the documents that are sent. The transmittal also contains specific (company or project-related) details to help further processing of the documents for the recipient.

The content of the transmittal document depends on the situation. Some typical content in a transmittal can be:

 Date of the sending.
 Name details of sender/company and recipient/company.
 Project name, number(s), and other references to the project.
 Reason(s) for sending.
 Deadline(s) and/or descriptions of actions to be taken by recipient.
 Other status details.
 List of files sent: file name, size, type, revision number and other relevant metadata.
 Limitations, security measures or other dependencies of the document transmittal.

Transmittals are used in engineering and construction companies as a necessary tool in projects where a large number of documents are involved. Several document handling systems have functions for generating transmittal document along with packages of document for transfer.

See also
 Letter of transmittal

External links 
transmittal document

References

Secondary sector of the economy